Beckett Bould (28 September 1880 – 25 September 1970) was a British actor.

Partial filmography

 Black Diamonds (1932) - John Morgan
 The Outcast (1934) - Minor Role (uncredited)
 Wednesday's Luck (1936) - Minor Role (uncredited)
 Holiday's End (1937) - Philpotts
 South Riding (1938) - Foreman on Road Building Site (uncredited)
 Old Mother Riley's Circus (1941) - Davis
 The Day Will Dawn (1942) - Bergen, Spokesman of Langedal
 Let the People Sing (1942) - Minor Role (uncredited)
 The Shipbuilders (1943)
 Loyal Heart (1946) - Burton
 The October Man (1947) - Policeman at Left Luggage Office (uncredited)
 Anna Karenina (1948) - Matvey
 My Brother's Keeper (1948) - Inspector (uncredited)
 Portrait of Clare (1950) - Bissell
 Pool of London (1951) - The Murdered Watchman (uncredited)
 What Every Woman Wants (1954) - Tom
 Lease of Life (1954) - Sproatley
 Ramsbottom Rides Again (1956)
 Fighting Mad (1957) - Jake
 Let's Be Happy (1957) - Rev. MacDonald
 Second Fiddle (1957) - General
 Rock You Sinners (1958) - McIver
 Nowhere to Go (1958) - Gamekeeper (uncredited)
 The Flesh and the Fiends (1960) - Old Angus
 The Angry Silence (1960) - Arkwright
 Don't Bother to Knock (1961) - Old Man

References

External links

1880 births
1970 deaths
English male stage actors
English male film actors
English male television actors
People from Dewsbury
20th-century English male actors